Vladislava "Vaca" Đorđević (born 10 May 1974) is a Serbian actress. She is best known for  being SpongeBob's voice from the SpongeBob SquarePants series in Serbian dub.

Biography
Vladislava Đorđević was born on May 10, 1974, in Belgrade, SFR Yugoslavia (now Serbia). She is a graduate of the Academy of Arts Braca Karic in the class of professor Predrag Ejdus. She has also released two albums with the group Vrooom in which she was singing. She is playing in the Malo pozorište Duško Radović, Atelje 212, and other theaters. She also works at the television B92, where she is filming drama shows, commercials and also syncs animated cartoons. For the best actress in "You're lying Melita", she was awarded with the Small Marulić in Split 2010.

Personal life
Vladislava has older sister Anja Đorđević who is a composer and interpreter.

Serbian voice roles

References

External links
 

1974 births
Living people
Serbian stage actresses
Serbian voice actresses
21st-century Serbian actresses
Serbian television actresses
Actresses from Belgrade